List of Mixed Doubles Grand Slam tennis tournament champions:

Although several players have won at least one title in each of the four majors to achieve the Career Grand Slam, only three players have won the Grand Slam, all four titles in a single calendar year. This includes one team, Margaret Court and Ken Fletcher in 1963, as well as Court and Owen Davidson separately with different partners. Billie Jean King completed the "non-calendar year Grand Slam" by winning all four majors in a row in a period spanning two calendar years.

Champions by year

Champions list

Most Grand Slam mixed doubles titles

Individual 
Record title holder and tournament record indicated in bold. 
Players with at least five titles are included here.

Team 
Record title holder and tournament record indicated in bold. 
Teams with three or more Grand Slam titles are included here.

Grand Slam achievements

Grand Slam 
Players who held all four Grand Slam titles simultaneously (in a calendar year).

Non-calendar year Grand Slam 
Players who held all four Grand Slam titles simultaneously (not in a calendar year).

Career Grand Slam
Players who won all four Grand Slam titles over the course of their careers.
 The event at which the Career Grand Slam was completed indicated in bold.

Individual

Team

Multiples titles in a season

Three titles

Two titles

Tournament stats

Most titles per tournament

Most consecutive titles

Overall record

At one tournament

Grand slam titles by decade 

1880s

1890s

1900s

1910s

1920s

1930s

1940s

1950s

1960s

1970s

1980s

1990s

2000s

2010s

2020s

Grand Slam titles by country 
Note: Titles, won by a team of players from same country, count as one title, not two.

All-time

Open Era

See also

 Grand Slam (tennis)
 List of Grand Slam–related tennis records
 List of Grand Slam men's singles champions
 List of Grand Slam women's singles champions
 List of Grand Slam men's doubles champions
 List of Grand Slam women's doubles champions

References

Mix
 
Grand Slam